"Love You To" is a song by the English rock band the Beatles from their 1966 album Revolver. The song was written and sung by George Harrison and features Indian instrumentation such as sitar and tabla. Following Harrison's introduction of the sitar on "Norwegian Wood (This Bird Has Flown)" in 1965, it was the first Beatles song to fully reflect the influence of Indian classical music. The recording was made with minimal participation from Harrison's bandmates; instead, he created the track with tabla player Anil Bhagwat and other Indian musicians from the Asian Music Circle in London.

The composition adheres to the pitches of the Indian equivalent of Dorian mode and emulates the khyal vocal tradition of Hindustani classical music. For musical inspiration, Harrison drew from the work of master sitarist Ravi Shankar, who became his sitar tutor shortly after the recording was completed. In its lyrical themes, "Love You To" is partly a love song to Harrison's wife, Pattie Boyd, while also incorporating philosophical concepts inspired by his experimentation with the hallucinogenic drug LSD. In the context of its release, the song served as one of the first examples of the Beatles expressing an ideology aligned with that of the emergent counterculture.

"Love You To" has been hailed by musicologists and critics as groundbreaking in its presentation of a non-Western musical form to rock audiences, particularly with regard to authenticity and avoidance of parody. Author Jonathan Gould describes the song's slow sitar introduction as "one of the most brazenly exotic acts of stylistic experimentation ever heard on a popular LP". Ronnie Montrose, Bongwater, Jim James and Cornershop are among the artists who have covered "Love You To".

Background and inspiration

On the 1965 album Rubber Soul, George Harrison had led the Beatles towards Indian classical music through his use of the Indian sitar on John Lennon's song "Norwegian Wood (This Bird Has Flown)", while his own composition "If I Needed Someone" reflected the genre's influence in its melody and suggestion of drone. He subsequently wrote "Love You To" as a way to showcase the sitar, and to feature the tabla, a pair of Indian hand drums, for the first time. Music critic Richie Unterberger describes the song as the Beatles' "first all-out excursion" in raga rock, a genre that author Nicholas Schaffner says was "launched" by Harrison's use of sitar on "Norwegian Wood".

Harrison wrote "Love You To" in early 1966 while the Beatles were enjoying an unusually long period free of professional commitments, due to their inability to find a suitable film project. He used the available time to further explore his interest in Indian music and the sitar, which, journalist Maureen Cleave noted in a contemporary article, "has given new meaning to [his] life". Aside from honeymooning in Barbados with his wife, English model Pattie Boyd, Harrison's activities included receiving sitar tuition from an Indian musician at the Asian Music Circle (AMC) in north London, where he also attended music recitals, and seeing Indian sitarist Ravi Shankar perform at the Royal Festival Hall. As reflected in "Love You To", Harrison continued to immerse himself in recordings by Shankar, who, when the pair met in June 1966, would agree to take Harrison as his student. This meeting took place at the home of the AMC's founders, Ayana and Patricia Angadi, whose network of friends and visitors added to Harrison's self-education in new forms of art, culture and politics.

Typically of his songs over this period, Harrison was unable to commit to naming the new composition. At the start of the sessions for the Beatles' Revolver album, Geoff Emerick, the band's recording engineer, gave the song the working title of "Granny Smith", after the variety of apple. The song was partly inspired by Harrison's experimentation with the hallucinogenic drug LSD, which he credited as a catalyst for increased awareness and his interest in Eastern philosophical concepts. Author Ian MacDonald views the subject matter as "part philosophical" and "part love-song" to Boyd.

Composition

Musical form
"Love You To" is in the key of C and adheres to the pitches of Kafi thaat, the Indian equivalent of Dorian mode. The composition emulates the khyal vocal tradition of Hindustani (or North Indian) classical music. Structurally, it comprises an opening alap; a gat section, which serves as the main portion of the song; and a short drut (fast) gat to close the piece.

The alap consists of sitar played in free tempo, during which the song's melody is previewed in the style of an Indian raga. Described by Harrison biographer Simon Leng as "essentially an adaptation of a blues lick", the seven-note motif that closes the alap serves as a recurring motif during the ensuing gat. The change of metre following the alap marks the first such example in the Beatles' work; it would shortly be repeated in Lennon's composition "She Said She Said", which Harrison helped complete by joining together three separate pieces that Lennon had written.

The gat is set in madhya laya (medium tempo) and features a driving rock rhythm accentuated by heavy tambura drone. This portion of the composition consists of eight-bar "A" sections and twelve-bar "B" sections, structured in an A-B-A-B pattern. The alap's lack of a distinct time signature is contrasted with a temporal reference in the lyrics to the opening verse: "Each day just goes so fast / I turn around, it's past". Throughout, the vocal line avoids the melodic embellishment typical of khyal, apart from the use of melisma over the last line in each of the A sections. In keeping with the minimal harmonic movement of Indian music, the composition's only deviation from its I chord of C is a series of implied VII chord changes, which occur in the B sections.

During the mid-song instrumental passage, the melody line of the sitar incorporates aspects of the alap, raising the melody previewed there by an octave. The song then returns to verses sung over the A and B sections, culminating in the line "I'll make love to you, if you want me to." The arrival of the drut gat follows Hindustani convention by ending the composition at an accelerated tempo, although the brevity of this segment marks a departure from the same tradition.

Lyrical interpretation
As with all of the songs written by Harrison or Lennon and recorded by the Beatles in 1966, the lyrics to "Love You To" marked a departure from the standard love-song themes that had defined the group's previous work. Harrison presents a worldview that variously reflects cynicism, sardonic humour and a degree of detachment with regard to personal relationships. According to music critic John Harris, the lines "There's people standing round / Who'll screw you in the ground / They'll fill you in with all the sins you'll see" serve as one of the first examples of the Beatles' ideology aligning with that of the emerging 1960s counterculture, by highlighting the division between traditional mores and an LSD-inspired perspective. Authors Russell Reising and Jim LeBlanc recognise this and other statements in "Love You To" as part of the Beatles' espousal of anti-materialism from 1966 onwards, a message that, inspired by the LSD experience, suggested a "psychedelic vision of society".

Among other commentators discussing the lyrical themes, Mark Hertsgaard writes that Harrison's "response to the fleetingness of time was to affirm and celebrate life: 'make love all day long / make love singing songs'", while Robert Rodriguez describes "Love You To" as "a somewhat oblique expression of love directed toward his bride, along with larger concerns regarding mortality and purpose". In Ian Inglis' estimation, the lyrics "remind us that in a world of material dissatisfaction and moral disharmony, there is always the solace of sexual pleasure".

Recording
"Love You To" was the third track the Beatles recorded for Revolver, after "Tomorrow Never Knows" and "Got to Get You into My Life". Rodriguez comments that "Love You To" "[made] explicit the Indian influence implicit throughout the entire album", as songs such as "Tomorrow Never Knows" and "Got to Get You into My Life", together with the non-album single tracks "Paperback Writer" and "Rain", all incorporate drone sounds or otherwise display the limited harmonic movement that typifies the genre. In a 1997 interview, Harrison said that the song's inclusion reflected the band's willingness to experiment during this period, adding: "We were listening to all sorts of things, Stockhausen, avant-garde music, whatever, and most of it made its way onto our records."

The basic track for "Love You To" was taped in London at EMI Studios (now Abbey Road Studios) on 11 April 1966. According to Beatles historian Mark Lewisohn, Harrison initially sang and played acoustic guitar, accompanied by Paul McCartney on backing vocals. By the end of the first session that day, three takes of the song had been made, with Harrison introducing his sitar on the last of these takes. Work resumed at 8 pm, with the participation of Anil Bhagwat, a tabla player that Harrison had sourced through Patricia Angadi. Other outside contributors, also from the AMC, included musicians on tambura and sitar.

According to Inglis, "Love You To" is "defined" by the interplay between sitar and tabla. Bhagwat later recalled of his involvement: "George told me what he wanted and I tuned the tabla with him. He suggested I play something in the Ravi Shankar style, 16-beats, though he agreed that I should improvise. Indian music is all improvisation." After rehearsing the song together many times, Harrison and Bhagwat recorded the sitar and tabla parts onto the vocal and guitar performance taped earlier that day.

With take 6 selected as the best performance, a reduction mix was carried out on 13 April, freeing up space for more overdubs on the four-track tape. Harrison added another vocal part onto what was now referred to as take 7, and Ringo Starr played tambourine. McCartney contributed a high harmony vocal over the words "They'll fill you in with all their sins, you'll see", but this part was omitted from the final mix. Harrison also overdubbed fuzz-tone electric guitar, controlling the output via a volume pedal. Producer Tony Visconti has marvelled at the guitar sounds the Beatles introduced on Revolver, particularly Harrison's part on "Love You To", which he says "sounds like a chainsaw cutting down a tree in Vermont".

Credit for the main sitar part on "Love You To" has traditionally been the subject of debate among commentators. While MacDonald says that, rather than Harrison, it was the sitarist from the AMC who played this part, Rodriguez writes that "others point to [Harrison's] single-minded diligence in mastering the instrument, as well as his study through private lessons, proximity to accomplished musicians, and close listening to pertinent records." In his official history of the Beatles' recording career, The Complete Beatles Recording Sessions, Lewisohn states: "George played the sitar but an outside musician, Anil Bhagwat, was recruited to play the tabla." Musicologist Walter Everett also identifies Harrison as the main sitar player on the recording, as does Peter Lavezzoli, author of The Dawn of Indian Music in the West. Leng comments that, as on "Norwegian Wood", Harrison "is still playing the sitar like a guitar player [on the recording], using blues and rock 'n' roll bends rather than the intensely intricate Indian equivalents". Speaking to author Steve Turner, Bhagwat has dismissed the idea that the sitarist was not Harrison, saying: "I can tell you here and now – 100 percent it was George on sitar throughout."

Final mixing for the song took place on 21 June as the Beatles rushed to complete Revolver before beginning the first leg of their 1966 world tour. Harrison discussed "Love You To" with Shankar when the two musicians met that month, at a social event hosted by the Angadi family. Although he was unaware of the band's popularity and had yet to hear "Norwegian Wood", Shankar was impressed with Harrison's humility as the guitarist downplayed his sitar recordings with the Beatles as merely "experiments". Soon after this meeting, Shankar gave Harrison his first sitar lesson at Kinfauns, his and Boyd's home in Surrey, and later, with tablist Alla Rakha, performed a private recital there for Harrison, Lennon and Starr. Harrison subsequently recalled of his first lesson with Shankar: "I felt I wanted to walk out of my home that day and take a one-way ticket to Calcutta. I would even have left Pattie behind in that moment."

Release
Revolver was released on 5 August 1966, with "Love You To" sequenced as the fourth track. In advance of the release, EMI had issued the songs to radio stations throughout July, in increments, to prepare the Beatles' audience for the progression the band had made with their latest work. According to cultural historian Simon Philo, the album represented "pop's most sustained deployment of Indian instruments, musical form and even religious philosophy thus far – which all came together most notably on ['Love You To']". By that point, the Beatles' association with Indian music had been firmly established, after, at Harrison's suggestion, the band stopped over in Delhi on the return flight from their concerts in the Far East. During the highly publicised visit, all four members of the group bought musical instruments from Rikhi Ram & Sons in Connaught Place. Bhagwat's name appeared on the LP's back cover, one of the few times that an outside musician received an official credit on a Beatles album.

Among commentators recalling the song's release, Peter Doggett describes "Love You To" as having "sounded astonishing next to the electrifying pop of the Revolver album". Hertsgaard writes: "what caught most people's interest was the exotic rhythm track. The opening descent of shimmering harplike notes beckoned even those who resisted Indian music, while the lyrics melded the mysticism of the East ... with the pragmatism of the West, and the hedonism of youth culture."

In his 1977 book The Beatles Forever, Schaffner wrote that, next to the dominant Lennon–McCartney songwriting partnership, Harrison's three compositions on Revolver – "Love You To", "Taxman" and "I Want to Tell You" – "offered ample indication that there were now three prolific songwriting Beatles". Schaffner also commented that, through his championing of the sitar and Shankar's music, Harrison came to be seen as "the maharaja of raga-rock" among Western musicians. In the Beatles' 1968 animated film Yellow Submarine, a brief portion of the song is used to introduce Harrison's character, as a guru-like figure, standing on a hill.

Critical reception
In a joint album review with Peter Jones for Record Mirror, Richard Green enthused about "Love You To", saying: "Starts like a classical Indian recital ... This is great. So different. Play it again! Best [track] so far." As an example of what Turner views as older pop journalists being unable to evaluate the new progressive music of 1966, Allen Evans of the NME described the song as an "Oriental-sounding piece" with "sitar jangles" and a "Kama Sutra-type lyric". Melody Makers reviewer lauded Harrison's sitar playing as "stunning" and "tremendous" before concluding: "Fascinating mixture of minor melody with Indian accompaniment. One of the most striking tracks."

Disc and Music Echos review of Revolver took the form of a track-by-track rundown by Ray Davies of the Kinks, whose July 1965 single "See My Friends" became widely viewed as one of the first pop songs to incorporate Eastern elements. In his comments on "Love You To", Davies said that Harrison "must have quite a big influence on the group now", adding that "it's well performed which is always true of a Beatles track." Davies also said: "This sort of song I was doing two years ago – now I'm doing what the Beatles were doing two years ago."

Writing in the recently launched Crawdaddy!, Paul Williams "heaped praise" on "Love You To", according to Rodriguez. The majority of contemporary US reviews were lukewarm towards Revolver, however, in reaction to the publication of Lennon's comment to Maureen Cleave that the Beatles had become more popular than Christ. An exception was New York critic Richard Goldstein, who praised the album as "a revolutionary record", and later wrote that the song's lyrics "exploded with a passionate sutra quality". While bemoaning the initial lack of recognition for Revolver, KRLA Beats reviewer said that Harrison had "created a new extension of the music form which he introduced in Rubber Soul", and described "Love You To" as "Well done and musically valid. Also musically unrecognized."

Retrospective assessment and legacy

Writing in the journal Asian Music, ethnomusicologist David Reck has cited "Love You To" as being revolutionary in Western culture, adding: "One cannot emphasise how absolutely unprecedented this piece is in the history of popular music. For the first time an Asian music was not parodied utilising familiar stereotypes and misconceptions, but rather transferred in toto into a new environment with sympathy and rare understanding." Reck views it as the first in "a series of finely crafted Indian-based songs" by Harrison that would extend through his solo career, and while admiring the range of authentic Hindustani musical elements in the composition, he concludes: "All of this in a three-minute song!" Peter Lavezzoli describes "Love You To" as "the first conscious attempt in pop to emulate a non-Western form of music in structure and instrumentation", while Reck calls it "the first song in the Euro-American pop music canon that is scored predominantly for Asian musical instruments, [with] sitar, tabla and tambura replacing rock band guitars, keyboards, bass and drums". Lavezzoli says of the sitar part: "[Harrison's] playing throughout the song is an astonishing improvement over 'Norwegian Wood'. In fact, 'Love You To' remains the most accomplished performance on sitar by any rock musician."

Music critic Lester Bangs termed "Love You To" "the first injection of ersatz Eastern wisdom into rock", while Peter Doggett credits Harrison's spiritual concerns with inspiring "an entire [new] genre of songwriting". The song has been recognised as a precursor to the world music genre. Through the success of Revolver in 1966, it was a key factor in the rise in popularity of Indian classical music among contemporary Western youth. In addition, the song inspired other rock musicians to experiment with non-Western instruments and tones, and so helped expand the scope of raga rock, while its mix of Indian instrumentation and distorted electric guitar was highly influential in the development of 1960s psychedelic music.

Reviewing Harrison's musical career in a 2002 issue of Goldmine magazine, Dave Thompson wrote that "Love You To" "opened creative doors through which Harrison's bandmates may not – and [George] Martin certainly would not – have ever dreamed of passing". Rolling Stone contributor Greg Kot pairs it with "Taxman" as two "major contributions" that saw Harrison "[come] into his own as a songwriter" on Revolver. Kot describes "Love You To" as "a boldly experimental track" and "the first full-scale incorporation of Eastern instruments on a Beatles album". Writing on his music website Elsewhere, Graham Reid views the song as a "classic" due to its standing as "arguably the first in Western pop ... which owes nothing to pop music traditions. It is an Indian song in its structure and execution."

AllMusic editor Stephen Thomas Erlewine considers "Love You To" to be Harrison's "first and best foray into Indian music", while Bruce Eder, also writing for AllMusic, views it as "exquisite". In his song review for the same website, Richie Unterberger is unimpressed with the track; while acknowledging that "Love You To" was "Undoubtedly ... another indication of the group's rapidly broadening barriers", he cites a lead vocal that "drone[s] on in a rather lugubrious way", Harrison's slightly "disheveled" sitar playing, and lyrics that constitute "a rather muddled mix of free love advocacy, meditations on the transience of life on Earth, and chip-on-the-shoulder wariness of people out to exploit him". Although he finds the melody "sourly repetitious", Ian MacDonald writes that the track is "distinguished by the authenticity of its Hindustani classical instrumentation and techniques", and admires Harrison's understanding of the genre. In a 2009 review for Paste magazine, Mark Kemp described Revolver as the album on which the Beatles "completed their transformation from the mop tops of three years earlier into bold, groundbreaking experimental rockers", and added: "Harrison's 'Love You To' is pure Indian raga – sitar and tablas punctuated by the occasional luminous guitar riff jolting through the song's paranoid, drug-fueled lyrics like a blinding ray of sun into a dark forest."

Cover versions
The Trypes, an offshoot of the Feelies, covered "Love You To" on their 1984 EP The Explorers Hold. A version by Ronnie Montrose, titled "Love to You" and including a rare vocal performance by the guitarist, appeared on his album Territory in 1986. The song was covered by experimental rock band Bongwater in 1988 on their debut album Double Bummer.

My Morning Jacket singer Jim James performed "Love You To" on a banjo for his 2009 EP Tribute To, a collection of Harrison songs that James recorded shortly after the former Beatle's death in November 2001. Mojo included James's version on Harrison Covered, a tribute CD accompanying the November 2011 issue of the magazine. In 2012, Cornershop recorded it for Mojos multi-artist compilation Yellow Submarine Resurfaces.

Personnel
According to Kenneth Womack and Ian MacDonald:

The Beatles
George Harrison – lead and backing vocals, acoustic guitar, sitar, rhythm guitar, fuzz-tone lead guitar
Paul McCartney – backing vocal
Ringo Starr – tambourine

Additional musicians
Anil Bhagwat – tabla
Unnamed musicians from the Asian Music Circle – sitar, tambura

Notes

References

Sources

External links
 Full lyrics for the song at the Beatles' official website
 
 "The Beatles' magical mystery tour of India", Live Mint, 20 January 2018

1966 songs
The Beatles songs
Songs written by George Harrison
Song recordings produced by George Martin
Songs published by Northern Songs
The Beatles and India
Raga rock songs